Dimensionless numbers in fluid mechanics are a set of dimensionless quantities that have an important role in analyzing the behavior of fluids. Common examples include the Reynolds or the Mach numbers, which describe as ratios the relative magnitude of fluid and physical system characteristics, such as density, viscosity, speed of sound, flow speed, etc.

Diffusive numbers in transport phenomena

As a general example of how dimensionless numbers arise in fluid mechanics, the classical numbers in transport phenomena of mass, momentum, and energy are principally analyzed by the ratio of effective diffusivities in each transport mechanism. The six dimensionless numbers give the relative strengths of the different phenomena of inertia, viscosity, conductive heat transport, and diffusive mass transport. (In the table, the diagonals give common symbols for the quantities, and the given dimensionless number is the ratio of the left column quantity over top row quantity; e.g. Re = inertial force/viscous force = vd/ν.) These same quantities may alternatively be expressed as ratios of characteristic time, length, or energy scales. Such forms are less commonly used in practice, but can provide insight into particular applications.

Droplet formation

Droplet formation mostly depends on momentum, viscosity and surface tension. In inkjet printing for example, an ink with a too high Ohnesorge number would not jet properly, and an ink with a too low Ohnesorge number would be jetted with many satellite drops. Not all of the quantity ratios are explicitly named, though each of the unnamed ratios could be expressed as a product of two other named dimensionless numbers.

List 
All numbers are dimensionless quantities.  See other article for extensive list of dimensionless quantities.  Certain dimensionless quantities of some importance to fluid mechanics are given below:

References

 

Dimensionless numbers of fluid mechanics
Fluid dynamics